Sir John Williams  (died 1846) was an English judge, known for overseeing the 1830s trials of the Tolpuddle Martyrs (R v Lovelass and Others), and the Flash Female Button Makers Union.

He was made a King's Counsel in Easter Term 1827. On 28 February 1834 he was made a serjeant-at-law and raised to the bench as one of the puisne barons of the Court of Exchequer, succeeding Sir John Bayley; he was knighted on 16 April 1834. On 29 April 1834 he transferred to the Court of King's Bench as puisne justice, exchanging places with Sir James Parke. He died on 14 September 1846 and was succeeded by Sir William Erle.

References

Footnotes

Bibliography 

 
 

1846 deaths
19th-century English judges
Date of birth missing
Serjeants-at-law (England)
Barons of the Exchequer
Knights Bachelor